The 2016 Mississippi College Choctaws football team represented  Mississippi College in the 2016 NCAA Division II football season. They were led by head coach John Bland, who was in his third season at Mississippi College. The Choctaws played their home games at Robinson-Hale Stadium and were members of the Gulf South Conference. They finished the season with a record of 3 wins and 7 losses (3–7 overall, 1–7 in the GSC) and were not invited in the 2016 playoffs.

Schedule
Mississippi College announced its 2016 football schedule on July 18, 2016. The schedule consists of six home and four away games in the regular season. The Choctaws will host GSC foes North Alabama, Valdosta State, West Alabama, and West Florida, and will travel to Delta State, Florida Tech, Shorter, and West Georgia.

The Choctaws will host both non-conference games against Cumberland of the Mid-South Conference and Point of the Sun Conference.

References

Mississippi College
Mississippi College Choctaws football seasons
Mississippi College Choctaws football